402nd or 402d may refer to:

402d Bombardment Squadron, inactive United States Air Force unit
402d Fighter Squadron, inactive United States Air Force unit
402d Fighter-Day Group, inactive United States Air Force unit
402d Maintenance Wing, wing of the United States Air Force based out of Robins Air Force Base, Georgia
402nd Field Artillery Brigade (United States), AC/RC/NG unit based at Fort Bliss, Texas
402nd Support Brigade (United States), support brigade of the United States Army

See also
402 (number)
402, the year 402 (CDII) of the Julian calendar
402 BC